Coyuca de Benítez  is one of the 81 municipalities of Guerrero, in south-western Mexico. The municipal seat lies at Coyuca de Benítez. The municipality covers an area of 1,602.9 km².

As of 2005, the municipality had a total population of 69,064.

References 

Municipalities of Guerrero